The Borrowers is a 1952 juvenile fantasy novel by Mary Norton.

The Borrowers may also refer to:

One of several film and television adaptations of the novel:
The Borrowers (1973 film), a 1973 television adaptation
The Borrowers (1992 TV series), a 1992 television series
The Borrowers (1997 film), a 1997 film
Arrietty, a 2010 Japanese film, also known as The Borrower Arrietty or simply The Secret World of Arrietty.
The Borrowers (2011 film), a 2011 television film
The Borrower, a 1991 science-fiction horror film

See also
borrower, a recipient of a loan